Clappison's Corners is a community located in the city of Hamilton, Ontario, Canada.

In East and West Flamborough Ts., Reg. Mun. of Hamilton- Wentworth and Hwys 5 & 6, 7 km. NW of Hamilton.

The community, also known as Clappisons Corners, Clappisons and Clappison was named after a family that settled at the junction of the two roadways.  17 Main N, Waterdown, Ontario

References

Neighbourhoods in Hamilton, Ontario